State House is the official residence of the president of Kenya. It was the prime minister's residence from independence until 12 December 1964 when Kenya became a republic. As the prime minister's position was abolished, it has been the official residence of the president ever since.

History
Before the construction of Government House in Nairobi, the first governor's residence was at Government House, Mombasa, constructed in 1879. Government House in Nairobi, now State House, was built in 1907 in Nairobi to serve as the official residence of the governor of British East Africa, when Kenya was a colony within the British Empire. The governor would conduct his official functions at the old Provincial Commissioner's office (now a national monument) next to Nyayo House and then retire to Government House for the day. It was designed by the British architect Sir Herbert Baker.

After independence, Government House was renamed State House. Although it remained the official residence of the Head of State, in practice it became an administrative or operational office occasionally providing accommodation to visiting state guests and receptions on National Days. This scenario has prevailed to-date with the late Mzee Jomo Kenyatta and President Moi preferring private residences as opposed to living in State House.

Other residences
State House in Nairobi stands on a  piece of land. It is a 10-minute drive from the city centre. Other than the Nairobi one, there are other State Houses in Mombasa and Nakuru.

There are state lodges in Eldoret, Sagana, Kisumu, Kakamega,Kitale town, Rumuruti, Cheran'gany and Kisii. They are scattered around the country to provide accommodation to the president whenever he is touring various parts of the country.

President Uhuru Kenyatta once met Somali Prime Minister Abdi Farah Shirdon in Sagana State Lodge, which is said to be Kenya's own version of Chequers in Buckinghamshire or Camp David in Maryland. The president was said to be shifting key presidential functions to stations outside Nairobi.

See also

 Government Houses of Africa
 Government Houses of the British Empire
 Governor-General of Kenya

References

External links

 The Presidency | Official Website of the President
 State House, Kenya satellite picture in Google Maps 

Houses completed in 1907
Official residences in Kenya
Government Houses of the British Empire and Commonwealth
Presidential residences
Buildings and structures in Nairobi
British Kenya
Government buildings completed in 1907
Herbert Baker buildings and structures